Julio Eduardo Angulo Medina (born May 28, 1990) is an Ecuadorian footballer. He currently plays as a forward.

Club career
Angulo began his career as a professional footballer at Barcelona SC. The club's new head coach Benito Floro requested his presence for the motivated project called La Renovacion.

Honours
Independiente del Valle
Copa Libertadores Runner Up (1): 2016

LDU Quito
Ecuadorian Serie A: 2018

References

External links
Ecuafutbol profile
Club profile
BDFA profile

1990 births
Living people
Sportspeople from Guayaquil
Ecuadorian footballers
Ecuadorian Serie A players
Argentine Primera División players
Liga MX players
Barcelona S.C. footballers
C.D. Cuenca footballers
C.S.D. Independiente del Valle footballers
Club Atlético Huracán footballers
Club Tijuana footballers
L.D.U. Quito footballers
Mushuc Runa S.C. footballers
Association football forwards
Ecuadorian expatriate footballers
Expatriate footballers in Argentina
Expatriate footballers in Mexico
Ecuadorian expatriate sportspeople in Argentina
Ecuadorian expatriate sportspeople in Mexico